Raymond Chow (1927–2018) was a Hong Kong film producer.

Raymond Chow is also the name of:

Raymond "Shrimp Boy" Chow, Hong Kong-born American criminal
Raymond Chow (artist), Canadian artist

See also
Raymond Cho (disambiguation)